Regius Professor of Botany may refer to 

 Regius Professor of Botany (Aberdeen)
 Regius Professor of Botany (Cambridge)
 Regius Professor of Botany (Glasgow)